{{Infobox television station
| callsign               = KBZC-LD
| city                   = Oklahoma City, Oklahoma
| logo                   =
| branding               = 
| digital                = 20 (UHF)
| virtual                = 42
| subchannels            = 
| translators            = 
| location               = Oklahoma City, Oklahoma
| country                = United States
| owner                  = HC2 Holdings
| licensee               = DTV America Corporation
| founded                = October 2, 2012
| airdate                = 
| callsign_meaning       = 
| sister_stations        = KUOC-LD, KOHC-CD, KTOU-LD, KZLL-LD
| former_callsigns       = K42LL-D (2012-2016)
| former_channel_numbers = ''"Digital:42 (UHF, 2014–2021)
| former_affiliations    = DT1:Silent (2012–2016)Bounce TV (2016)American Sports Network (2016–2017)Stadium (2017-2019)
| erp                    = 7 kW3 kW (CP)
| haat                   = 
| facility_id            = 188841
| coordinates            = 
| website                = 
}}KBZC-LD''', virtual channel 42 and UHF digital channel 20, is a low-powered Quest-affiliated television station serving Oklahoma City, Oklahoma, United States. The station is owned by the DTV America Corporation, as part of a duopoly with Buzzr affiliate KUOC-LD (channel 48, in Enid, Oklahoma).

History
Although the Federal Communications Commission granted a construction permit for the station in 2012 under the callsign of K42LL-D, the station didn't sign on the air until July 26, 2016, under the current KBZC-LD callsign.

Digital channels
The station's digital signal is multiplexed:

References

External links
DTV America

Buzzr affiliates
Low-power television stations in the United States
Innovate Corp.
BZC-LD
2016 establishments in Oklahoma
Television channels and stations established in 2016